Computation of time may refer to:

 Computation of time (Catholic canon law)
 Computation of time (law)

See also 

 Process (computing)